Polyipnus asteroides, commonly known as the shortspine tenplate, is a species of ray-finned fish in the family Sternoptychidae. It occurs in deep water in the western Atlantic Ocean from the Gulf of Maine southward to the Caribbean Sea and the Gulf of Mexico.

References

Sternoptychidae
Fish described in 1938
Taxa named by Leonard Peter Schultz